Bachsas (Bangladesh Cholochitra Sangbadik Samity) Awards was introduced in 1972 to encourage the fledgling film industry of the country. Bangladesh Cholochchitra Shangbadik Samity (Bangladesh Cine-Journalists' Association) gave out their most prestigious awards to outstanding performers in film, television, music, dance and theatre.

History
Bachsas Award is the first Bangladeshi award introduced after liberation war. The motto of the award was "Creative films with social commitment" and the symbol was the Royal Bengal Tiger. First award was given for the films of 1972 and 1973. The categories of the awards were Best film (production), direction, story, screenplay, dialogue, leading and supporting actor, leading and supporting actress, music direction, male and female playback singers, camera work, editing and sound recording. Documentary films of special importance, and initiating new or alternative trends were also awarded. The awards were given regularly up to 1988. After a break of 7 years, the awards were reintroduced in 1995.

Juries and rules
The juries are appointed by the Bachsas elected committee. The Board members are from different walks of the society like Social Worker, Government officers, Educationist, Journalists, film maker, Film producer, Actor-Actress, Poet etc.

Awards
The awards include:

Lifetime Achievement Awards
 Film
 Music
 Literature

Honorary Awards
 Aziz Misir Critic Award
 S M Parvez Memorial Award
 Fazlul Haque Memorial Award
 Ahmed Zaman Chowdhury Memorial Award
 Belaal Ahmed Memorial Award

Film

 Best film
 Best direction
 Best actor
 best actress
 Best supporting actor
 Best supporting actress
 Best music
 Best lyrics
 Best Male Playback Singer
 Best Female Playback Singer
 Best story
 best dialogue
 Best screenplay
 Best art-direction
 Best editing
 Best cameraman

Telefilm
 Best Telefilm
 Best direction
 Best actor
 best actress

Drama serial

 Best drama serial
 Best dramatist
 Best director
 Best cinematographer
 Best actor
 Best actress
 Best supporting actor
 Best supporting actress

Drama

 Best drama
 Best dramatist
 Best director
 Best cinematographer
 Best actor
 Best actress
 Best supporting actor
 Best supporting actress

Program
 Best anchor
 Best magazine show (Entertainment)
 Best information-based program

Theatre
 Best production
 Best playwright
 Best set-design
 Best theatre group
 Best actor
 Best actress

Music
 Best Male Singer
 Best Female Singer
 Best Band
 Best Male Vocal
 Best Female Vocal

Awards by decade
 Bachsas Awards (1972–1980): 1972  →1974  →1975  →1976  →1977  →1978  →1979  → 1980 
 Bachsas Awards (1981–1990): →1981  → 1982   →1983  →1984  →1985  → 1986  → 1987  → 1988  
Bachsas Awards (1991–2000): → 1995  → 1996  → 1997  → 1998  → 1999  → 2000 
 Bachsas Awards (2001–2010): 2001  → 2002  → 2003  → 2004  → 2005  → 2006  → 2007  → 2008  → 2009  → 2010  
 Bachsas Awards (2011–2020): 2011  → 2012  → 2013  → 2014  → 2015  → 2016  → 2017  → 2018

See also
 National Film Awards
 Meril Prothom Alo Awards
 Ifad Film Club Award
 Babisas Award
 Channel i Music Awards

References

 
Awards established in 1972
Bangladeshi film awards
Civil awards and decorations of Bangladesh